Camouflage is the debut solo album by Irish musician Sonny Condell. It was released in June 1977 in Ireland by Mulligan Music.

Track listing

Personnel
 Sonny Condell – acoustic guitar, vocals, saxophone, percussion
 Jolyon Jackson – keyboards, cello
 Greg Boland – acoustic and electric guitar, bass guitar
 Fran Breen – drums, percussion
 Ciarán Brennan – double bass
 Brian Dunning – flutes
 Paul Barrett – trombone
 Rosemary Taylor – backup vocals

Production
 Shaun Davey – production
 Brian Materson – engineering
 Sonny Condell – cover design
 Michael Fitzgerald – front & back covers photography
 Bill Doyle – Ciarán Brennan photography

Release history

References

1977 debut albums
Sonny Condell albums